Gymnanthula is a genus of cnidarians belonging to the family Botrucnidiferidae.

The species of this genus are found in Northeastern Africa.

Species:
 Gymnanthula sennai (Calabresi, 1927)

References

Botrucnidiferidae
Anthozoa genera